Pandemic is a 2016 American science fiction thriller film directed by John Suits and written by Dustin T. Benson. Rachel Nichols stars as a doctor who leads a group to find survivors of a worldwide pandemic. The film is shot in a first-person POV, similar to first-person shooter video games.

Plot 
Lauren Chase, a doctor from New York, comes to Los Angeles to find survivors of a worldwide pandemic. She is assisted by her team, which includes Gunner, Denise, and Wheeler.

Cast 
 Rachel Nichols as Lauren Chase/Rebecca Thomas
 Alfie Allen as Wheeler
 Paul Guilfoyle as Doctor Greer
 Danielle Rose Russell as Megan Thomas
 Missi Pyle as Denise
 Mekhi Phifer as Gunner

Production 
Suits came upon the script, which was initially named Viral, at the Blood List, a repository of unproduced horror and thriller scripts. Suits does not consider the film to be found footage and instead says, "Rather than a found footage movie, I consider it more as a POV first-person movie." The camera setups were designed to simulate this first-person POV rather than someone who is carrying a camera. Suits said that they did not have a successful formula to follow for such a film, though he watched Maniac and Enter the Void for inspiration. Two camera operators, one female and one male, shot the film. The camera operator of the appropriate sex would substitute for whichever character's POV was represented.

Although he was a gamer in his youth, Suits said he could not find time to play many video games for research. Instead, he talked to gamer friends, watched YouTube videos, and discussed interesting kill scenes with the stunt coordinator.

Release 
Pandemic premiered at FrightFest Glasgow on February 26, 2016. It replaced Cell at the last moment. XLrator Media gave the film a limited release on April 1, 2016. It was released via video on demand on April 4, 2016.

Reception 
Despite some positive reviews the overall reception by critics was mostly negative. The aggregator site Rotten Tomatoes gives it a score of 44%, based on 16 reviews. The average rating was 4.80 out of 10.

Jonathan Hatfull of SciFiNow described it as "an energetic POV zombie action movie with some impressive action and less than impressive characterisation". Anton Bitel of Twitch Film called it "a thoroughly bleak portrait of rapid societal breakdown" that is also "a collection of genre clichés". Howard Gorman of Shock Till You Drop wrote, "Relying that much more on the narrative and players involved than POV 'gimmickry', Pandemic succeeds in keeping its audience invested and entertained." Dennis Harvey of Variety called it "a solid if not quite memorable entry in the ever-expanding canon of survivalist undead cinema". Justin Lowe of The Hollywood Reporter, in comparing it to Night of the Living Dead and other zombie films, said it shares similar themes but lacks the realism and gravitas. Martin Tsai of the Los Angeles Times wrote, "Pandemic proves serviceably frightening, if sporadically gory, maximizing tension derived from unknown dangers".

References

External links 
 
 

2016 films
2016 action thriller films
2016 science fiction films
American action thriller films
American science fiction action films
American science fiction thriller films
Apocalyptic films
American zombie films
Films shot from the first-person perspective
2010s English-language films
2010s American films